Fernando Picó Bauermeister, S.J. (August 15, 1941 – June 27, 2017) was a Puerto Rican Jesuit, historian and academic. Picó was a leading expert on the history of Puerto Rico and was considered an authority on the island's 20th century history. One of his best known works, Historia General de Puerto Rico, is widely utilized in Puerto Rican history curricula. He was a professor of history at the University of Puerto Rico, Río Piedras Campus, from 1972 until his death in 2017.

Biography
Picó was born in the district of Santurce, in San Juan, Puerto Rico, on August 15, 1941, to Florencio Picó and Matilde Bauermeister Picó. He attended the Colegio San Ignacio de Loyola, a Catholic, Jesuit, college-preparatory school in San Juan, from 1954 to 1958. Picó then received his bachelor's degree from Springfield College in Massachusetts.

In 1959, he entered the Saint Andrew-on-Hudson seminary, a Jesuit seminary located in Hyde Park, New York, where he studied philosophy and theology. He received a master's degree in history from Fordham University in 1966 and obtained his doctorate from Johns Hopkins University in 1970. His doctoral thesis was entitled The Bishops of France in the Reign of Louis IX (1226-70). On May 22, 1971, Picó was ordained a Jesuit priest and took his final vows on September 14, 1980. Additionally, he studied in Italy and Spain.

Picó was considered one of the leading authorities on Puerto Rican history. One of his best known publications, "Historia General De Puerto Rico," is a required text in many curriculums on the island. His articles have been published in numerous Puerto Rican, mainland American, and international magazines and newspapers.  He taught at the Department of History at the University of Puerto Rico, Río Piedras Campus from 1972 and collaborated with the Association of Caribbean Historians until his death in 2017.

In 2008, Picó was awarded Eugenio María de Hostos Chair. He wrote the speech commemorating the 169th birthday of Eugenio María de Hostos, a major figure in 19th century Puerto Rican history, that year. The University of Puerto Rico honored Picó as a distinguished professor in 2010, calling him "the leading authority in the field of 19th century Island historiography, for his innovative projects, approaches, and methodologies."

In addition to his work as a Catholic priest and historian, Father Picó also authored several children's stories, including "La peinilla colorada." Picó, a humanitarian as well, worked with prison inmates.

Father Fernando Picó, who had suffered from some health problems for several months, became ill on June 26, 2017. He died unexpectedly at the Jesuit residence in Cupey, San Juan, Puerto Rico, on June 27, 2017, at the age of 75. On June 30, 2017, a public wake was organized to display his flag-draped coffin at the Tower Rotunda of the University of Puerto Rico, Rio Piedras Campus. He was survived by two sisters, Matilde Picó and Carmen Picó, and predeceased by his brother, Dr. Jose F. Picó.

Selected works authored
"Registro General de Jornaleros: Utuado, Puerto Rico 1849-50"
"Historia General de Puerto Rico" (1986)
"History of Puerto Rico: A Panorama of Its People" (1986)
"Vivir en Caimito" (1989)
"Puerto Rico, tierra adentro y mar afuera" (1991)
"La Peineta Colorada" (The Red Comb) (1991)
"Don Quijote en motora y otras andanzas" (1993)
 "El día menos pensado: Historia de los presidiarios en Puerto Rico (1793-1993)" (1994)
"Coffee, Society and Power in Latin America" (1995)
"Puerto Rico 1898: The War After The War" (2003)
"Puerto Rico Inside and Out: Changes and Continuities" (2008)
"Santurce y las voces de su gente" (2014)
Universitas Ludens (2019)

References

External links
 Association of Caribbean Historians

1941 births
2017 deaths
20th-century Puerto Rican historians
Historians of Puerto Rico
Puerto Rican Jesuits
20th-century American Jesuits
21st-century American Jesuits
21st-century Puerto Rican historians
American children's writers
University of Puerto Rico faculty
Colegio San Ignacio de Loyola alumni
Johns Hopkins University alumni
Fordham University alumni
Springfield College (Massachusetts) alumni
People from Santurce, Puerto Rico
People from San Juan, Puerto Rico